Relations between Bhutan and Russia were established in November 2011. An exhibition on Buddhism in Russia ran from November to December 2011, at the Nehru-Wangchuck Cultural Centre at the Embassy of India in Thimphu, Bhutan. This exhibition focused on developing humanitarian and cultural relations between Russia and Bhutan, and has been the first event of its kind in Bhutan.

See also

 Foreign relations of Bhutan
 Foreign relations of Russia

References

 
Russia
Bilateral relations of Russia